Marinospirillum megaterium is a helical, halophilic and Gram-negative bacterium from the genus of Marinospirillum which has been isolated from fermented brine.

References

External links
Type strain of Marinospirillum megaterium at BacDive -  the Bacterial Diversity Metadatabase

Oceanospirillales
Bacteria described in 1998